Happy Cow may refer to:
 HappyCow, a guide for vegan and vegetarian restaurants
 Happy Cow Creamery, a dairy farm in Pelzer, South Carolina
 The Happy Cow, a company founded by Lekgotla Kereng in 2017 with ambitions of improving the financial returns of farmers around the world, at its inception with a focus on the beef sector in Southern Africa

See also
The Laughing Cow, a brand of cheese products